Gallopin' Through is a 1923 American silent Western film directed by Robert N. Bradbury and starring Jack Hoxie, Priscilla Bonner and Doreen Turner.

Cast
 Jack Hoxie as Jack Hoxie
 Priscilla Bonner as Bert Wayne's Wife 
 Doreen Turner as Bert Wayne's Child
 Scout the Horse as Scout - Jack's Horse
 Bunk the Dog as Bunk - Jack's Dog

References

External links
 

1923 films
1923 Western (genre) films
1920s English-language films
American black-and-white films
Films directed by Robert N. Bradbury
Silent American Western (genre) films
1920s American films